Nueva Ocotepeque, with a population of 13,940 (2020 calculation), is the capital of the Ocotepeque Department of Honduras.

Nueva Ocotopeque was settled in 1935 after the site of the former town of Ocotepeque was destroyed by flooding of the river. It was briefly occupied by El Salvador during the Football War.

It is served by Nueva Ocotepeque Airport.

Education
My Little Red House Bilingual School, K-8.

Sources

Populated places in Honduras
Populated places established in 1935